Arne Naess may refer to:
Arne Næss (1912–2009), philosopher, mountaineer, and founder of deep ecology
Arne Næss Jr. (1937–2004), nephew of the above, businessman, mountaineer, husband of Diana Ross
Arne Lindtner Næss (born 1944), Norwegian actor and filmmaker
Arne Næss (politician) (1925–2009), Norwegian politician